Gianlorenzo Blengini (born 29 December 1971) is an Italian volleyball coach. He is the coach of the Italy national team and Italian Club Cucine Lube Civitanova. Blengini was promoted from the role of assistant coach after working under former coach Mauro Berruto. Blengini with Italy national team in 2015 won silver at the World Cup and bronze medal at the European Championship. Blengini with Italy national team won the silver medal at the 2016 Summer Olympics in Rio de Janeiro.

References

1971 births
Living people
Sportspeople from Turin
Italian volleyball coaches